Akulovo is a rural locality (a selo) and the administrative center of Akulovsky Selsoviet, Pervomaysky District, Altai Krai, Russia. The population was 731 as of 2013. There are 6 streets.

Geography 
Akulovo is located 79 km north of Novoaltaysk (the district's administrative centre) by road. Puryevo is the nearest rural locality.

References 

Rural localities in Pervomaysky District, Altai Krai